Stains is a commune in the Seine-Saint-Denis department, in the northern suburbs of Paris, France.

Heraldry

Population

Transport
Stains is served by Pierrefitte – Stains station on Paris RER line D. This station is located at the border between the commune of Stains and the commune of Pierrefitte-sur-Seine, on the Pierrefitte-sur-Seine side of the border.

Education
Schools in Stains:
 11 public preschools/nursery schools (maternelles)
 13 public elementary schools
 3 public junior high schools: Barbara, Joliot Curie, and Pablo Neruda
 1 public senior high school/sixth-form college: Lycée polyvalent Maurice Utrillo
 1 private junior high school: Collège privé Sainte-Marie.

Monuments
Château de Stains (destroyed in the War of 1870)
Cité-jardin de Stains
Town hall of Stains
Château de la Motte (destroyed in 1819 with the exception of a few outbuildings)
L'église Notre-Dame-de-l'Assomption de Stains (Church of Our Lady of the Assumption of Stains)

Notable people 

 Éric Junior Dina Ebimbe, footballer

Twin towns — Sister cities
Stains is twinned with:
 Saalfeld ( Germany ) since May 4, 1964: Twinning for joint projects of peace and collaboration between the German and French people.
 Cheshunt ( United Kingdom ) since 1965: Traditional twinning
 Luco dei Marsi ( Italy ) since December 15, 2000: Multilateral collaboration in the fields of sport, tourism, environment and development in the field of NICTs, allowing the enhancement of reciprocal cultural wealth.
 Am'ari ( Palestine ) since January 15, 1999: Multilateral cooperation with the Palestinian refugee camp of Am'ari in the West Bank, in solidarity with the peace forces in the region.
 Mengueme ( Cameroon ) since 2000: Cooperation agreement on health, education, sanitation, rural electrification, ecosystem preservation, development of agriculture, livestock but also culture, sport and tourism.
 Figuig ( Morocco ) since October 18, 2002: Cooperation agreement on youth citizenship, cultural exchanges, health and prevention, local development, town planning and the environment.

See also 
Communes of the Seine-Saint-Denis department

References

External links

Official website
Official website (in French)

Communes of Seine-Saint-Denis